The 1891 County Championship was the second officially organised running of the County Championship, and ran from 18 May to 27 August 1891. Surrey County Cricket Club claimed their second successive title by winning 12 of their 16 games.

Table
 One point was awarded for a win, and one point was taken away for each loss.

Leading averages

References

External links
1891 County Championship  at CricketArchive

1891 in English cricket
County Championship seasons
County